Jämshög is a locality situated in Olofström Municipality, Blekinge County, Sweden with 1,494 inhabitants in 2010.

It is the site of Jämshög Church (Jämshögs kyrka) in the Diocese of Lund. During the Northern Seven Years' War (1563 - 1570), the church was destroyed and when it was rebuilt  with a sacristy was added in 1778. In 1803, the church and the surrounding village were extinguished when the belfry, the vicarage and seven farmhouses were totally destroyed. The present church began to be erected on June 20, 1804 after drawings by architect Olof Tempelman (1745-1816).

Natives from Jämshög
John Fredrik Anderson, engineer 
Kalle Berglund, middle-distance runner
John Björkhem, Parapsychologist
Nils Olof Holst, geologist
Harry Martinson, author and nobel prize winner
Axel de la Nietze, author
Bengt Nordenberg, artist
Sven Edvin Salje, author
Pehr Thomasson, author

Sports
The following sports clubs are located in Jämshög:

 Jämshögs IF
 Jämshög Saints

References 

Populated places in Olofström Municipality
Harry Martinson